The Repeal Association was an Irish mass membership political movement set up by Daniel O'Connell in 1830 to campaign for a repeal of the Acts of Union of 1800 between Great Britain and Ireland.

The Association's aim was to revert Ireland to the constitutional position briefly achieved by Henry Grattan and his patriots in the 1780s—that is, legislative independence under the British Crown—but this time with a full Catholic involvement that was now possible following the Act of Emancipation in 1829, supported by the electorate approved under the Reform Act of 1832. On its failure by the late 1840s the Young Ireland movement developed.

Repealer candidates contested the 1832 United Kingdom general election in Ireland. Between 1835 and 1841, they formed a pact with the Whigs. Repealer candidates, unaffiliated with the Whig Party, contested the 1841 and 1847 general elections.

Electoral statistics
The seats figure in brackets is the position after election petitions and by-elections consequent upon election petitions, had been decided. There were 105 Irish MPs in the period.

Votes in 1835 and 1837 are included in the Liberal totals in Rallings and Thrasher's tables.

Sources: Walker and Rallings & Thrasher.

See also
 History of Ireland (1801–1923)
 Catholic Association
 Young Ireland

External links

 Loyal National Repeal Association

References
British Electoral Facts 1832 - 1999, compiled and edited by Colin Rallings and Michael Thrasher (Ashgate Publishing Ltd 2000)
Parliamentary Election Results in Ireland, 1801-1922, edited by B.M. Walker (Royal Irish Academy 1978)

History of Ireland (1801–1923)
Irish Repeal party
Irish Repeal party
Defunct political parties in Ireland
1830 establishments in the United Kingdom
1830 establishments in Ireland
1848 disestablishments in the United Kingdom
1848 disestablishments in Ireland
Political parties established in 1830
Political parties disestablished in 1848